"Love Missile F1-11" is the debut single by British band Sigue Sigue Sputnik, released in 1986 from their debut album Flaunt It. It was the band's biggest hit, reaching number three on the UK Singles Chart. The track was produced by Giorgio Moroder, after Prince rejected a request to oversee production, complaining the track was "too violent." The band approached Moroder due to his work on a number of Hollywood film scores, as well as his early Donna Summer records, with the latter inspiring the band's trademark repetitive, synthetic bass sound.

Style
The song features vocals with high echo and uses multiple sound effects to create a futuristic atmosphere. The 'Ultraviolence Mix' begins with a sample from Stanley Kubrick's 1971 film A Clockwork Orange where Malcolm McDowell's character, Alex, professes his fondness for a bit "of the old ultra-violence". None of the movie samples included in the originally released version of the single were cleared, resulting in film director Kubrick taking action against the band, who were forced to pay him a substantial fee. All samples were removed for the US release of the track, with some replaced by re-recordings using voice mimics, a move founding band member Tony James blames for "killing the record" in America.

Track listing
7": Parlophone / SSS 1 (UK)
"Love Missile F1-11" – 3:45
"Hack Attack" – 3:50

12": Parlophone / 12 SSS 1 (UK)
"Love Missile F1-11" (Extended Version) – 6:55
"Love Missile F1-11" (Dance Mix) – 4:27
"Hack Attack" – 3:50

12": Parlophone / 12 SSS 1 (UK)
"Love Missile F1-11" (The Bangkok Remix) – 6:28
"Love Missile F1-11" (Dance Mix) – 4:27
"Hack Attack" – 3:50

12": Manhattan / V-56021 (US)
"Love Missile F1-11" (Extended Version) – 6:52
"Love Missile F1-11" (Dance Mix) – 4:31
"Love Missile F1-11" (Single Version) – 3:45

Special Edition 12": Parlophone / 12 SSSX 1 (UK)
"Trailer Mix" – 1:16
"Love Missile F1-11" (Video Mix) – 3:45
"Love Missile F1-11 & 'Actuality' Sound" – 3:46
"Hard Attack" (Dub) – 3:52

Cassette: Manhattan / 4V 56021 (US)
"Love Missile F1-11" (Extended Version)
"Love Missile F1-11" (Dance Version)
"Love Missile F1-11" (Single Version)
"Love Missile F1-11" (Bangkok Remix)

Charts

Weekly charts

Year-end charts

Certifications

See also
List of number-one singles of 1986 (Spain)

References

1986 songs
1986 debut singles
1987 singles
Number-one singles in Spain
Parlophone singles
Sigue Sigue Sputnik songs
Songs written by Tony James (musician)
Song recordings produced by Giorgio Moroder